"Liar" is a song  by Australian band, Eskimo Joe, released in March 2002 as the fourth and final single from their debut album Girl as a double A side, with the re-released single, "Who Sold Her Out". The single peaked at number 94 on the ARIA charts.

The video for the "Liar" was directed by Nash Edgerton, and was nominated for ARIA Award for Best Video at the ARIA Music Awards of 2002.

Track listing

Charts

Release history

References

Eskimo Joe songs
2002 singles
2001 songs
Song recordings produced by Ed Buller
Modular Recordings singles
Songs written by Stuart MacLeod (musician)
Songs written by Joel Quartermain
Songs written by Kavyen Temperley